Local elections were held in Laguna on May 9, 2016, as part of the 2016 general election. Voters will select candidates for all local positions: a town mayor, vice mayor and town councilors, as well as members of the Sangguniang Panlalawigan, the vice-governor, governor and representatives for the four districts of Laguna, including the newly created Biñan lone district.

Incumbent Governor Ramil Hernandez is running for his first full three-year term as governor. Hernandez assumed the governorship in 2014 after the Commission on Elections disqualifies ER Ejercito for campaign overspending in the 2013 elections. Ejercito is seeking to regain his post.

Hernandez's running mate is Vice Governor Katherine Agapay while Niño Lajara is Ejercito's running mate.

Background
Incumbent governor Ramil Hernandez, who was the vice governor at that time, assumed office on May 27, 2014. This after the Commission on Elections disqualified incumbent Governor ER Ejercito, also known as Jorge Estregan, due to campaign overspending during the 2013 elections. When Ejercito was about to step down upon the advice of his uncle, former Philippine President and incumbent Mayor of Manila Joseph Estrada, he declared a statement:

This clearly states his intention to run in 2016. Ejercito is running under the United Nationalist Alliance to reclaim the governorship of the province. His running mate is Christian Niño Lajara, son of former Calamba Mayor Severino Lajara.

Under the Nacionalista Party, Hernandez will run for his first full three-year term as governor of the province, with Vice Governor Katherine Agapay as his running mate. Agapay, being the senior board member, assumed as vice governor upon the assumption of Hernandez as governor.

Agarao's Party
On October 2, 2015, on the LP Provincial convention in Santa Cruz, Laguna, and birthday party of Representative Benjie Agarao, which attended by presidential candidate Mar Roxas and senatorial candidate Francis Tolentino, which become controversial that Tolentino sent girl group Play Girls for a dance show, which was criticized by netizens due to obscene performance.

Coalition dispute
Hernandez, a member of the Nacionalista Party decided to coalesce with the Liberal Party, supporting Mar Roxas for the president. However, they will support, Alan Peter Cayetano, Bongbong Marcos or Antonio Trillanes IV as their Vice President—but all they're failed to get that party's nomination and instead running independents; Cayetano and Marcos are running mates for respective presidential candidates, Rodrigo Duterte of PDP–Laban and Miriam Defensor-Santiago of People's Reform Party, while Trillanes is supporting Grace Poe's presidential bid. However, Hernandez chose to support Roxas' running mate for vice president, Camarines Sur's Third District representative Leni Robredo. Despite the coalition, NP picked Incumbent Katherine Agapay as their candidate for vice governor while 3rd District Board Member Angelica Jones is LP's candidate for vice governor. Former 4th District Congressman Edgar San Luis, who ran for governor in 2013 but lost to Ejercito and decided not to run to give way for Hernanez, bolted the Liberal Party and moved to National Unity Party (even the NUP was already in coalesce with the Liberal coalition, known as "Koalisyon ng Daang Matuwid").

Candidates

Provincial elections

Governor

Vice governor

Congressional elections

1st District
Incumbent Danilo Fernandez is term limited and is running for Mayor of Santa Rosa. His party nominated incumbent Santa Rosa Mayor Arlene Arcillas

2nd District
Joaquin Chipeco, Jr. is the incumbent, he will stand unopposed for reelection.

3rd District
Sol Aragones is the incumbent. Her opponent is former Congressman and Former San Pablo Mayor Florante Aquino. And she got the highest vote for the position in this election.

4th District
Benjamin Agarao Jr. is the incumbent and his opponent is former Congressman Edgar San Luis.

Biñan
Incumbent Mayor Marlyn Alonte-Naguiat will run for the newly created Lone District unopposed.

Provincial Board Members

1st District
Cities: Biñan, Santa Rosa City, San Pedro City

2nd District
Cities: Cabuyao, Calamba
Municipality: Bay, Los Baños

3rd District
Cities: San Pablo City
Municipality: Alaminos, Calauan, Liliw. Nagcarlan, Rizal, Victoria

4th District
Municipalities: Cavinti, Famy, Kalayaan, Luisiana, Lumban, Mabitac, Magdalena, Majayjay, Paete, Pagsanjan, Pakil, Pangil, Pila, Santa Cruz, Santa Maria, Siniloan

City and municipal elections
All municipalities of Laguna, Biñan, Cabuyao, Calamba, San Pablo City, San Pedro City and Santa Rosa City will elect mayor and vice-mayor this election. The candidates for mayor and vice mayor with the highest number of votes wins the seat; they are voted separately, therefore, they may be of different parties when elected. Below is the list of mayoralty candidates of each city and municipalities per district.

1st District
Cities:San Pedro City, Santa Rosa City

San Pedro City

Incumbent Lourdes Cataquiz is running for reelection. His opponents are incumbent Vice Mayor Rafael Campos, Michael Casacop and Eugenio Ynion, Jr.

Incumbent Rafael Campos is running for Mayor. His party nominated Iryne Vierneza, daughter of former Mayor Felicisimo Vierneza. Her opponents are incumbent councilor Diwa Tayao and former Vice Mayor Norvic Solidum.

Santa Rosa City

Incumbent Arlene Arcillas is term limited and is running for Congress. Her party nominated incumbent Congressman Danilo Fernandez.

Incumbent Arnel Gomez is running for Mayor.

2nd District
Cities: Cabuyao, Calamba
Municipality: Bay, Los Baños

Cabuyao

Calamba
Both Mayor Justin Chipeco and Vice Mayor Roseller Rizal will stand unopposed for reelection.

Bay

Los Baños

3rd District
City: San Pablo City
Municipality: Alaminos, Calauan, Liliw. Nagcarlan, Rizal, Victoria

San Pablo City

Alaminos

Calauan

Liliw

Nagcarlan

Rizal

Victoria

4th District
Municipality: Cavinti, Famy, Kalayaan, Luisiana, Lumban, Mabitac, Magdalena, Majayjay, Laguna, Paete, Pagsanjan, Pakil, Pangil, Pila, Santa Cruz, Santa Maria, Siniloan

Cavinti

Famy

Kalayaan

Luisiana

Lumban

Mabitac

Magdalena

Majayjay

Paete

Pagsanjan

Pakil

Pangil
Incumbent Mayor Jovit Reyes of UNA seeks for reelection against councilor Oscar "Ka Popoy" Rafanan of Liberal Party.

Incumbent Vice Mayor Alberto "Jun" Astoveza Jr. of LP will run for reelection against UNA's bet councilor Al Pajarillo. This is the second time that Astoveza and Pajarillo will fight for the vice mayoral place.

Pila

Santa Cruz
Incumbent Mayor Domingo G. Panganiban is seeking for reelection for his third and final term. His opponent is his successor, former Mayor Ariel Magcalas.

Santa Maria

Siniloan

Biñan

References

2016 Philippine local elections
Elections in Laguna (province)
2016 elections in Calabarzon